The following table lists all the named streams that flow in Jefferson County. For each stream, the name, coordinate of the source, name of the stream it flows into, coordinate of the confluence, and political subdivision in which the confluence is located are given.

References 

 
Counties of Appalachia
Rivers of Pennsylvania
Tributaries of the Allegheny River
Wild and Scenic Rivers of the United States
Allegheny Plateau
Rivers of Armstrong County, Pennsylvania
Rivers of Clarion County, Pennsylvania
Rivers of Jefferson County, Pennsylvania